John Earl Warren Jr. (November 16, 1946 – January 14, 1969) was a United States Army officer and a recipient of the U.S. military's highest decoration — the Medal of Honor — for his actions in the Vietnam War.

Early life and education
Warren joined the U.S. Army from New York City in 1967.

Career
On January 14, 1969, as a first lieutenant, Warren was commanding a platoon in Tây Ninh Province, South Vietnam as part of Operation Toan Thang II, when the unit came under attack. During the fight, Warren fell on an enemy-thrown grenade to shield others from the blast. The action cost him his life.

Medal of Honor citation
Warren's official Medal of Honor citation reads:

For conspicuous gallantry and intrepidity in action at the risk of his life above and beyond the call of duty. 1st Lt. Warren, distinguished himself at the cost of his life while serving as a platoon leader with Company C. While moving through a rubber plantation to reinforce another friendly unit, Company C came under intense fire from a well-fortified enemy force. Disregarding his safety, 1st Lt. Warren with several of his men began maneuvering through the hail of enemy fire toward the hostile positions. When he had come to within 6 feet of one of the enemy bunkers and was preparing to toss a hand grenade into it, an enemy grenade was suddenly thrown into the middle of his small group. Thinking only of his men, 1st Lt. Warren fell in the direction of the grenade, thus shielding those around him from the blast. His action, performed at the cost of his life, saved 3 men from serious or mortal injury. First Lt. Warren's ultimate action of sacrifice to save the lives of his men was in keeping with the highest traditions of the military service and reflects great credit on him, his unit, and the U.S. Army.

Legacy
Warren is buried in Long Island National Cemetery, Farmingdale, New York.

See also

List of Medal of Honor recipients for the Vietnam War

References

1946 births
1969 deaths
American military personnel killed in the Vietnam War
United States Army Medal of Honor recipients
Burials at Long Island National Cemetery
Military personnel from New York City
United States Army officers
People from Brooklyn
Vietnam War recipients of the Medal of Honor
Deaths by hand grenade
United States Army personnel of the Vietnam War